Özhan Öztürk (born 1968) is a Turkish writer and researcher. He wrote a Turkish Folklore Encyclopaedia and an encyclopaedic dictionary of the culture and folklore of the peoples of the Black Sea region of Turkey.

Works 

 Karadeniz Ansiklopedik Sözlük, İstanbul, 2005. Heyamola Yayınları. 2 vol. 1256 pages 
 Bizim Temel (about national personification of the Pontic people, Temel) in Temel Kimdir, Heyamola Yayınları. Istanbul, 2006. 
 Folklor ve Mitoloji Sözlüğü, Ankara, 2009. Phoenix Yayınları. 1054 pages 
 Pontus: Antik Çağ’dan Günümüze Karadeniz’in Etnik ve Siyasi Tarihi (Pontus: The Ethnic and Political History of a Black Sea Region from Antiquity to Today) Genesis Yayınları. Ankara, 2011. 952 pages. 
 Dünya Mitolojisi (World Mythology). Nika Yayınları. Ankara, 2016 1264 pages 
 Articles, stories and research studies about Folklore and Pontus culture  mostly published in Doğa Karadeniz, Radikal daily newspaper and Folklore magazines.

See also 

Turkish folklore
Pontus

Notes

External links 
Personal Website of Özhan Öztürk
Crete in Trabzon Thrace in Artvin (An interview, 2005)
An Interview 

1968 births
Writers from Istanbul
Living people
Turkish folklorists